Louise Firouz, was an American-born, Iranian horse breeder and researcher who 'discovered' and helped to preserve the Caspian horse, a breed believed to be the ancestor of the Arab and other types of what are called "hot-blooded" (agile and spirited) horses, and previously thought to have been extinct for 1,300 years.

Remembered as a "phenomenon; a charming, intelligent, adventurous, American woman", she married a Persian prince from the Qajar dynasty and together they ran a horse breeding programme and riding school and raised a family through revolution, war and intrigue. That the horse now exists in sustainable numbers in several countries worldwide (including Australia, America, New Zealand and Britain) is considered largely due to her efforts. Firouz has been dubbed Iran's lady of horses. She died in 2008 in Gonbad having lived more than half a century in northern Iran.

Early life 
Louise Elizabeth Laylin was born in Washington DC; her father was an international lawyer who owned a farm at Great Falls, Virginia. She hoped to become a vet, but she failed her physics course and studied classics and English at Cornell University instead. She remembers:
I was brought up on a farm in Virginia. This was before the days of beltways and asphalt roads leading into the wilderness of the Virginia countryside so that when it became time for my two brothers and me to go to school we rode horses to the two-room red brick school house. In fine weather, especially in the autumn when the chincopin nuts were ripe we found it hard to abandon the horses so instead we abandoned school along with similarly inclined friends also mounted and sped towards the Potomac river and its heavily forested banks. We spent the days swimming and speculating what we would do with the rest of our indolent lives.'

As the Second World War was in full swing, no one paid attention to our lack of reading or writing skills. As long as we were up in time to milk the cows, make sandwiches for lunch and were off on the horses in the direction of school our Mother was too pre-occupied with her war work to notice our pristine exercise books. To this day, even with a college degree, I cannot write longhand but continue to print.

Eventually Louise's parents divorced. After a short, unhappy stint in New York City her mother bought a small farm in New Hampshire. 
Our farm was ten miles away on a dirt road with nothing else in sight except pastures, forest and deer. My brothers, John and David, were sent off to boarding school while I was enrolled in the local grammar school. At first, when the weather was fine, my Mother drove me to school but when the snows started we were stuck. We bought a small Morgan mare, a sleigh and a buggy and this was our transportation. Getting up in the dark each morning to hitch up the mare and drive the ten miles to school has given me a lifelong aversion to arising in the dark.

She moved on to a private school in nearby Peterborough but still had to drive her mare Rhoda to Hancock, put her in the church stable and take a taxi for the next 12 miles, repeating the process each evening. Eventually, she passed the College Board exams in Latin, Maths and English and was accepted by Cornell. However, her inability to master physics mean that she was rejected as a candidate for Veterinary College. My Sisyphus was incline planes and no matter how much I puzzled over rates of acceleration and deceleration I could not understand it.

Along with her brother she applied to do a junior year abroad at the American University of Beirut, where she was crowned as 'Snow Queen of Lebanon ' 1954, but by a series of misunderstandings she found herself expelled from the university.There were three other Americans there that year and we were soon taking excursions into the Bekaa valley and up to the ski slopes with other friends from Damascus, Aleppo and Jerusalem. We had classes in classical Arabic, Middle Eastern history and politics. A serious misunderstanding with college administrators over the antics of one of the Americans whom I had defended led to my expulsion from the University.

With no responsibility to study for the rest of the year, she took a job at Khayats bookstore, editing in their publishing business and also retraining horses at the Beirut race track. Before returning to Cornell to finish her degree, she took a brief trip to Tehran where she and her brother were met by a friend who introduced them to Narcy Firouz, a Yale-trained civil engineer and 'prince' descended from the Qajar dynasty that ruled Iran from 1779 to 1925.

First years in Iran 

After graduation in 1956, Louise agreed to meet Narcy in Paris. They were married next year and settled in Shiraz, where they lived in great style — she later remembered, hosting vast lunches for groups that regularly topped 30 people. Among their regular guests were the historian of Persian art Arthur Upham Pope and Kermit Roosevelt Jr, who had masterminded the CIA's Operation Ajax, which resulted in the overthrow of the Government of the Iranian Prime Minister Mohammed Mosaddeq in 1953.

In the late 1950s the Firouzes had established a riding academy in Tehran, the capital city of Iran, called the Norouzabad Equestrian Center. This was a favorite hang out for children of the well-off families living in Iran. Unfortunately, the Arabian and Turkoman stallions, typically ridden in that part of the world, were not always appropriate for her small charges. Hearing rumours of small horse-like ponies in the Alborz mountains near the Caspian Sea, she set out to investigate and in Amol she came across a bay stallion that was like nothing she had ever seen or read about. It was small, slight and finely proportioned, like an Arab horse in miniature, and had large protruding eyes, large nostrils, a prominent jaw, a dished face (curving inwards slightly) and a high-set tail. She soon found others, many in poor condition, but she was struck by their resemblance to the horses depicted on the rock relief carvings on the ruins of an ancient Persian palace at Persepolis near her Shiraz home.
That "Lydian Horse", had a similarly small prominent skull formation. Putting two and two together she realised that the Amol horses were a near relative to the ancient, lost breed of the royals – the Caspian Horse.

On that trip, she later said poetically, she watched the Caspian horse trot serenely back into history.

DNA testing carried out at the University of Kentucky's Horse Genome Project in 1990s later revealed a direct link to them and to the horses of Ancient Egypt.

Further Investigations and Breeding Programmes 
During this first trip Louise rescued 3 such horses, initially malnourished and covered with ticks, whose former owners had misused and over-worked them having no idea of the ancient breeds' near extinction. "Rest and good feeding produced immediate results, and gentle treatment soon overcame their initial suspicions and fears," she wrote in 1966. "They became affectionate and interested companions for children, and delightful rides. They are built to carry the weight of a child with the gait of a horse, and, except at full gallop, the speed of a horse, as I have established at our farm in Tehran. They could, in fact, become the perfect children's ponies, if steps were taken to preserve the breed, which, I fear, is in serious danger of extinction."

She acquired six stallions and seven mares and founded a breeding herd. These horses today remain the breed-standard for the Caspian Horse.
Louise and her husband financed the breeding programme themselves, but in 1970 a Royal Horse Society of Iran (RHS) was formed, with the Crown Prince, Prince Reza Pahlavi, as its patron, to protect and maintain Iran's native breeds. Between 1971 and 1976 Firouz — encouraged by the Duke of Edinburgh, who took a great interest in the Caspian breed after visiting the Royal Horse Society — exported to Europe some 26 Caspian horses of different bloodlines; these constituted the European Formation Herd. In 1974 the RHS took complete control of Firouz's remaining horses, then numbering 23.

Soon after, Louise started a new herd at Ghara Tappeh Sheihk near Kalaleh towards the border of Turkmenistan. Things started badly with two mares and a foal killed by wolves, but she arranged for eight newly bred horses to be exported to Britain. The RHS was angered by this, and in 1977 ordered her to hand over all but one horses of her new herd. The society banned the export of Caspian horses and collected all those remaining in Iran, many of which were eventually auctioned for use as beasts of burden or meat.

The Iranian Revolution – 1979 

After the Iranian revolution of 1979 the Firouzes were arrested and imprisoned, Louise for a few weeks but husband Narcy for six months. 
Much of their fortune was confiscated. Firouz had to sell her silver and jewels to feed her family during this time, but she gradually rebuilt her life, and was eventually able to establish a new herd of Caspian and Turkoman horses.

Rebuilding a herd after 1989 

During the Iran/Iraq war, most horses were sent to aid the war effort, some being used for low tech mine clearance, simply being set to walk across minefields. Nonetheless, in 1989, Firouz was invited to inspect those horses that survived for a possible Caspian breeding stock. Six potential foundation formed the basis of her "Persicus" stud. In 1994, seven of her Caspians were exported for breeding in England and in 1995 several Caspians from the UK, Australia and New Zealand were shipped to the USA. After her husband's death in 1994, Firouz sold the Persicus stud to an Iranian Ministry.  Louise formed a new herd of Caspians on behalf of a friend, German Businessman John Schneider-Mercke. However, she eventually had to concentrate on larger, more commercially viable Turkoman horses in order to support herself and her horses, which she used for taking international trekking parties out on her beloved Steppes until her death at the age of 74.

Aided by such visits into Iran and support of concerned individuals from Canada and the United States, this final Caspian breeding program was launched from her remote farm at Gara Tepe Sheikh on the Turkoman Steppes. On some of her last treks in the spring of 1999, two foundation Caspian stallions and eight Caspian foundation mares were gathered to once again be rescued by Mrs. Firouz' nurturing care.  With her regal ability of overlooking her often tragic past and seemingly overwhelming losses, she experienced the joy of watching the newborn Caspian foals thrive under her ever-watchful eye until her death in 2008.

The Caspian Horse Today 

Firouz's efforts to save the Caspian horses from starvation and slaughter by exportation during the early years of the Islamic Revolution, mean that a total of 19 foundation lines have been exported around the world (through 9 stallions and 17 mares).

The number of Caspians in Iran is still quite small. But at the time of Louise's death in 2008 there were about 1,600 Caspians worldwide. Exportation out of Iran was halted in the early 1990s, with a small shipment arriving in Great Britain, after a tortuous journey through the Belarous war-zone where bandits attacked and robbed the convoy.

Louise's husband Narcy died in May 1994. Due to estate settlement, and the financial incurred in the shipment of the last 7 Caspians out of Iran into England she was unable to continue her breeding program in Iran. The remainder of Mrs. Firouz's Caspian horses were sold to the Ministry of Jehad. The fate of the Caspians remaining in Iran was once again in jeopardy. The American Livestock Breeds Conservancy in Pittsboro, N.C., places the Caspian horse on its list of most-endangered animals, meaning there are fewer than 200 annual registrations of purebreds in the United States and an estimated global population of fewer than 2,000.

The British Caspian Trust, which had evolved from the Caspian Stud UK, original recipient of some of her Iran-bred horses, has played an important role in the breed's survival, keeping detailed records of horses and preventing inbreeding by advocating the cyclic crossing method whereby each foundation mare was bred to a different foundation stallion.

Death 
Firouz died on May 25, 2008 at a hospital near her home in northeastern Iran. She had lung and liver failure.

Family 

Louise and Narcy were married at the farm, Hidden Springs, in Virginia and had two daughters, Roshan and Ateshe and a son Caren. Roshan married (and then divorced) British diplomat Sir David Reddaway, and had three children: Alexander, Touran and Milo. Ateshe married Björn Larsson, a Swedish diplomat, and had two children: Leyla and Narcy. Caren married Leyla Filsoof, and had two children: Samira and Kamran.

See also
Iranian culture
Iranian women's movement

External links
 Louise Ferouz obituary
 Firouz obituary in the Telegraph, UK

References

Iranian scholars
People from Gonbad-e Qabus
Racehorse owners and breeders
American emigrants to Iran
Iranian people of American descent
2008 deaths
1933 births